Clara of Brunswick-Wolfenbüttel (16 November 1532 in Wolfenbüttel – 23 November 1595 at Herzberg Castle), was a princess of Brunswick-Wolfenbüttel by birth.  She was abbess of the secular Gandersheim Abbey and later Duchess of Brunswick-Grubenhagen by marriage.

Life 
Clara was the youngest daughter of the Duke Henry II of Brunswick-Wolfenbüttel (1489–1568) from his first marriage with Maria (1496–1541), daughter of the Earl Henry of Württemberg.

Abbess of Gandersheim 
At the urging of her father, Clara was elected abbess of Gandersheim Abbey after the death of her sister Maria.  Since Clara was only 6 years old at the time, officials acting for her father administered the abbey in her name.  It is unknown if the Pope ever confirmed Clara as abbess.  In any case, she never took up the position.

In 1542, troops of the Schmalkaldic League occupied Gandersheim and forced the Abbey to convert to Lutheranism.  The Chapter, however, practiced passive resistance and remained Catholic.  In 1543, the abbey suffered from iconoclasm.  In 1547, Clara's father declared her resignation from the office of abbess, returning to the lay state.

Duchess of Brunswick-Grubenhagen 
Clara married on 1 July 1560 in Wolfenbüttel with her cousin Duke Philip II of Brunswick-Grubenhagen (1533–1596).  As dowry, her father gave her  and half the jurisdiction and castle of Westerhof.  The marriage remained childless.  After their marriage, the couple moved to Katlenburg Castle and converted it to a Renaissance château. Clara was responsible for the installation of numerous pharmacies and destileries.  She also designed the interior of the newly built church in Rotenkirchen.

When Clara's brother Julius inherited Wolfenbüttel in 1568, he also took possession of Westerhof.  Clara sued him before the Aulic Council, but in 1580, Philip confirmed Juilius's ownership.  Clara then sued Julius over the inheritance of her sister Margaret.  The Aulic Council created an imperial commission to look into the matter.  Julius, however, rejected the commission and filed a complaint at the Diet of Augsburg of 1582 about the illegal practices of his sister.

Clara and her court moved from Katlenburg Castle to Herzberg Castle.  She died in 1595, after a long illness.  The court preacher and superintendent Andreas Georg Leopold delivered her funeral sermon, which was also published in printed form.  Clara was buried in the Aegidius Church in Osterode am Harz.

References 
 Hans Goetting: Das Bistum Hildesheim, Walter de Gruyter, 1973, p. 121 ff
 Johann Samuel Ersch: Allgemeine encyclopädie der wissenschaften und künste, J. f. Gleditsch, 1847, part 3, vol. 23, p. 43 ff

External links 
 https://archive.today/20130102054202/http://www.calsky.com/lexikon/de/txt/s/st/stift_gandersheim.php
 http://thepeerage.com/p766.htm#i7658

Footnotes 

Secular abbesses
Clara
1532 births
1595 deaths
People from Wolfenbüttel
Abbesses of Gandersheim
Daughters of monarchs